Leucadendron foedum, the Hopefield conebush, is a flower-bearing shrub belonging to the genus Leucadendron and forms part of the fynbos. The plant is native to the Western Cape, South Africa, and occurs from Piketberg to Hopefield.

Description
The plant dies in a fire but the seeds survive. The seeds are stored in a toll on the female plant, fall to the ground after a fire and are spread by the wind. The plant is unisexual and there are separate plants with male and female flowers.

References 

 http://redlist.sanbi.org/species.php?species=794-50
 http://biodiversityexplorer.info/plants/proteaceae/leucadendron_foedum.htm
 https://www.proteaatlas.org.za/ldfoed.htm

foedum